The Battle of Murche-Khort (Persian: نبرد مورچه‌خورت) was the last decisive engagement of Nader's campaign to restore Tahmasp II to the Persian throne. Ashraf Hotak had failed to arrest Nader's advance onto Isfahan at Khwar pass where his ambush was discovered, surrounded and ambushed itself. The battle was fought in an uncharacteristic manner by the Afghans who to some extent sought to replicate their foes tactical systems which had so badly devastated their armies up to this point. Victory opened a clear road south towards Isfahan and the return of Safavid rule for a few brief years before Nader himself would overthrow it.

Background

Events in Isfahan
Ashraf's arrival in Isfahan heralded a massacre of over 3,000 Persian aristocrats & clergymen carried out in the cruel, cold calculation that his catastrophic defeat at Mihmandoost would encourage an uprising in Isfahan as soon as he were to ride out of the city with his army to meet Nader's forces which were bearing down on Isfahan.

Removing any potential leaders of revolt in Isfahan ensured that he would not be caught between the Persian army in the north and a resurgent Isfahan in the south. This purge was carried out with particular brutality, looting and destroying much of the Bazaar in a fire, though the extremity of the measure would count as another of the atrocities perpetrated by the Afghans during their brief and bloody rule in Persia with a damning verdict from historians ever since helping to create a very authentic image in the eyes of posterity of Afghan rule in Iran as a mere case of uncivilized, brute, beastly, savage barbarians ransacking a civilization.

Ottoman Support
After Nader's crushing victories against the Ghilzai Afghans in northern Persia he wrote letters to the Ottomans requesting the immediate withdrawal from historic Safavid lands which they had acquired from Ashraf by the Treaty of Hamadan. Realizing the threat of a resurgent Persia on their eastern border the Ottomans responded to Ashraf's requests for help, sending him both guns and artillerymen. On October 31, 1729, having augmented his army's fire power substantially with Ottoman aid Ashraf marched out of an Isfahan even more destitute than at the time of Mahmud's siege.

Battle

Deployment
Moving north the Afghans reached a defensible position near Murche-Khort approximately 55 kilometres north of Isfahan. On November 13, 1729 Nader's army came into view. Observing the strength of the entrenched position Ashraf had selected, Nader attempted to lure him out first by artillery fire and then by marching around him and towards Isfahan. Alas this ruse met with no more success than the first.

Ashraf was far too cunning to be duped in this manner and in fact had done excellently in devising a new approach to counter Nader's seemingly invincible system which was evidently immune to the thundering charge of Afghan horsemen which had swept all before it in previous engagements, even the Ottomans. Recognizing that any attack on the Persian army was doomed to failure, Ashraf deployed his artillery in a circular fashion all around his centre which was a long line of entrenched infantry, in effect giving him a pivot to manoeuvre his cavalry around.

Engagement
Nader drew up his Jazāyerchi (musketeers) in a line corresponding to that of their entrenched foes. He sent a contingent of cavalry under Haj Beg Afshar around to the east to menace the Afghan right flank and kept the rest of his cavalry in reserve in order foil any attempt by Ashraf to flank or disrupt his musketeers onslaught against the Afghan infantry in the centre. The uniform advance of the Jazāyerchi was little affected by either Afghan musketry and cannon fire, continuing right up to the trenches where they unleashed deadly volleys at close range before drawing swords and coming to grips with the enemy.

No effort was spared by Ashraf to try and relieve the pressure from his infantry in the centre and many charges were made by his cavalry against the Persian infantry's flank and rear but were all intercepted and thrown back by Nader's cavalry reserve. Eventually the centre of the Afghan army dissolved under pressure and Ashraf having done his utmost to keep order amongst his unravelling army was forced to concede another crushing defeat, leading him to flee with the utmost urgency in order to reach Isfahan before Nader.

Aftermath
Such was the panic-stricken haste with which Ashraf and his entourage fled to Isfahan that they rode through the city gates that very afternoon, fresh from their defeat at Murche-Khort. Scrambling for any items of value he loaded as much as he could onto as many four-legged beasts as he could find and along with a few princesses of the Safavid house left Isfahan for Shiraz at dawn. The Ottoman artillerymen who had become Nader's prisoners were treated with mercy and permitted to journey home.

See also
Military of the Afsharid dynasty of Persia
Restoration of Tahmasp II to the Safavid throne
Battle of Damghan (1729)
Battle of Khwar Pass
Hotaki dynasty

References

Murche-Khort
1729 in Iran
Murche-Kort
History of Isfahan Province
Campaigns of Nader Shah